"Ringo for President" is a 1964 novelty song by The Young World Singers released on Decca Records. Released during the 1964 U.S. presidential elections, it advocates Beatles drummer Ringo Starr as the ideal presidential candidate because he doesn't talk about war. The single “bubbled under” the Billboard Hot 100 at No. 132. Some Beatles fans started touting Starr as a write-in candidate, and others went to the Republican National Convention in California with signs referring to the song title. The song was also covered by Australian entertainer Rolf Harris.

Sources

1964 songs
Novelty songs
Political songs
Anti-war songs
Songs about Ringo Starr
Songs about presidents of the United States